The 11th Special Operations Intelligence Squadron is an intelligence unit of the United States Air Force. It provides tailored full-motion video processing, exploitation and dissemination for special operations forces engaged in both combat and non-combat operations worldwide.

History

Predecessors

5th Photographic Technical Squadron
The first predecessor of the squadron, the 5th Photographic Technical Squadron was activated at Will Rogers Field, Oklahoma.  After about four months of training under III Reconnaissance Command, the squadron deployed to New Guinea, where it was assigned to the 91st Photographic Wing.  It saw combat with the 91st Wing as Far East Air Forces advanced through the Philippines and Ryuku Islands toward Japan.  Following V-J Day, the squadron returned to the Philippines, where it was inactivated in 1946.

The squadron was activated in the reserves at Long Beach Airport in August 1949, although it is not clear to what extent the unit was manned or equipped. 
President Truman's reduced 1949 defense budget required reductions in the number of units in the Air Force,  Combined with the conversion of reserve units to the wing/base organization, this resulted in the inactivation of the 5th in June 1949.

99th Reconnaissance Technical Squadron
In January 1953, the 111th Strategic Reconnaissance Wing, a Pennsylvania Air National Guard unit that had been mobilized for the Korean War was returned to state control.  In its place, Strategic Air Command (SAC) activated the regular 99th Strategic Reconnaissance Wing at Fairchild Air Force Base, Washington.  As part of this action, the mission, personnel and equipment of the 111th Reconnaissance Technical Squadron were transferred to the newly activated 99th Reconnaissance Technical Squadron.  The squadron processed and distributed reconnaissance products produced by the wing.

On 16 June 1954 the 99th Wing, along with SAC's other Convair B-36 Peacemaker reconnaissance wings, was assigned bombing as its primary mission, although it retained its designation as a reconnaissance wing until 1955. and its planes retained a reconnaissance capability.  The 99th Reconnaissance Technical Squadron was inactivated in April 1955, and its assets were transferred to the 4199th Reconnaissance Technical Squadron, which was assigned to the 57th Air Division, but attached to the 99th Bombardment Wing until the wing left Fairchild in September 1956.

Activation as intelligence squadron
In October 1984, the 5th Photographic Technical Squadron and the 99th Reconnaissance Technical Squadron were consolidated as the 11th Reconnaissance Technical Squadron, but were never active under that name.  In the summer of 2006, the consolidated squadron was redesignated the 11th Intelligence Squadron and assigned to Air Force Special Operations Command for activation.

The squadron was activated in August 2006, to provide tailored dedicated intelligence support to special operations forces.  It was the first imagery and full-motion video intelligence unit to be specifically assigned to Air Force Special Operations Command.  At the time, it was unique among Air Force intelligence squadrons in that it did not report to Air Force Intelligence, Surveillance and Reconnaissance Agency.

Growth in special operations missions and in reconnaissance operations in support of the Global War on Terrorism led to the unit becoming one of the fastest growing Air Force units.  The unit expanded to include detachments at Fort Bragg, North Carolina and Cannon Air Force Base, New Mexico.  In addition, the unit is affiliated with the National Geospatial-Intelligence Agency in Washington, DC and St. Louis, Missouri.

With the growth in unmanned aerial vehicles and full-motion video capabilities, the 11th Special Operations Intelligence Squadron is responsible for more than half of all the full-motion video exploited by the U.S. military.

Lineage
 5th Photographic Technical Squadron
 Constituted as the 5th Photographic Technical Squadron on 9 October 1943
 Activated on 20 October 1943
 Inactivated on 29 April 1946
 Allotted to the reserve on 12 July 1948
 Activated on 10 August 1948
 Inactivated on 27 June 1949
 Consolidated with the 99th Reconnaissance Technical Squadron as the 11th Reconnaissance Technical Squadronon 16 October 1984

 11th Special Operations Intelligence Squadron
 Constituted as the 99th Reconnaissance Technical Squadron on 1 January 1953 and activated
 Inactivated on 15 April 1955
 Consolidated with the 5th Photographic Technical Squadron as the 11th Reconnaissance Technical Squadron on 16 October 1984
 Redesignated 11 Intelligence Squadron on 26 July 2006
 Activated on 1 August 2006
 Redesignated 11th Special Operations Intelligence Squadron on 31 July 2016

Assignments
 8th Photographic Group, 20 October 1943
 III Reconnaissance Command, 15 January 1944
 91st Photographic Wing (later 91st Reconnaissance Wing, 91st Air Division), 15 April 1944 – 29 April 1946
 Fourth Air Force, 10 August 1948
 Continental Air Command, 1 December 1948 – 27 June 1949
 99th Strategic Reconnaissance Wing, 1 January 1953 – 15 Apr 1955
 Air Forces Special Operations Forces, 1 August 2006
 Twenty-Third Air Force (Air Forces Special Operations Forces), 1 January 2008
 27th Special Operations Group, 31 July 2012
 1st Special Operations Group, 16 April 2013 – present

Stations
 Will Rogers Field, Oklahoma, 20 October 1943
 Camp Stoneman, California, 24 February–12 March 1944
 Nadzab Airfield Complex, New Guinea, April 1944
 Leyte, Philippines, 8 November 1944
 Toguchi, Okinawa, 6 July 1945
 Tachikawa Airfield, Japan, 23 October 1945
 Luzon, Philippines, December 1945 – 29 Apr 1946
 Long Beach Airport, California, 10 August 1948 – 27 June 1949
 Fairchild Air Force Base, Washington, 1 January 1953 – 15 April 1955
 Hurlburt Field, Florida, 1 August 2006 – present

Campaigns
 Operation Iraqi Freedom
 Operation Enduring Freedom - Afghanistan
 Operation Enduring Freedom - Philippines
 Operation Enduring Freedom - Horn of Africa
 Operation Enduring Freedom - Trans-Sahara
 Operation Unified Response

References

Notes
 Explanatory notes

 Citations

Bibliography

 
 
 

011
011
1943 establishments in the United States